Newton is a 2017 Indian Hindi-language black comedy drama film co-written and directed by Amit V. Masurkar. The film stars Rajkummar Rao in the titular role of a government servant who is sent to a politically sensitive area of central India on election duty. Pankaj Tripathi, Anjali Patil and Raghubir Yadav appeared in prominent roles.
The film was produced by Manish Mundra under Drishyam Films, known for the 2015 film Masaan. The film is Amit Masurkar’s second feature after his debut with Sulemani Keeda in 2013.

Newton had its world premiere in the Forum section of the 67th Berlin International Film Festival. The film received universal acclaim, securing eight nominations at the 63rd Filmfare Awards, including Best Film (Critics), Best Actor (Critics) for Rao and Best Supporting Actor for Tripathi, while winning Best Film and Filmfare Award for Best Story.
Rao won the Asia Pacific Screen Award for Best Actor and the writers won the award for Best Screenplay. Newton was also awarded the National Film Award for Best Feature Film in Hindi. Pankaj Tripathi won a special mention at 65th National Film Awards. The film was selected as the Indian entry for the Best Foreign Language Film at the 90th Academy Awards.

Plot 
Nutan "Newton" Kumar (Rajkummar Rao), a rookie government clerk on reserve is sent on election duty to a Naxal-controlled town in the insurgency-ridden jungles of Chhattisgarh, India, when one of the main duty officers there is found to be facing heart problems. Faced with the apathy of the war-weary Central Reserve Police Force (CRPF) security forces, led by Assistant Commandant Aatma Singh (Pankaj Tripathi), and the looming fear of guerrilla attacks by communist insurgents, he tries his best to conduct free and fair voting despite the odds stacked against him. He is disappointed when the voters do not turn up for the election. Later when a foreign reporter turns up at the polling station the CRPF force the villagers from the constituency to turn up to cast their votes. When one of them enters the polling booth, he becomes bewildered by the voting machine and its operation.

After talking to the lot, soon Newton realizes that they have no idea what the election is about. Some thought they would earn money from this, while others asked hopelessly about getting paid sufficiently for their work. He desperately tries to educate them but to no avail. Taking the lead, a frustrated Aatma Singh pushes Newton aside and shames the villagers by telling them that these officers have risked their lives for their vote, and they should not turn them away. He tells them that the voting machine is a toy; there are symbols of elephants, cycles, etc. and they could press any symbol they like (leaving them uneducated about the fact that those symbols represent respective political parties). So while they vote for their favorite symbol, instead of politicians they have never heard about, the foreign reporter gets a good news report about India's democracy.

Newton wants to sit at the polling booth for the stipulated time but is forced to flee due to a Naxal ambush which he realizes later was staged by the CRPF. On gaining such knowledge, he tries to outrun his escort team back to the polling booth, but gets caught on both sides, and is forcefully taken back to safety. On the way back Newton decides to collect the votes of four villagers who suddenly turn up from deep inside the forest. Aatma Singh is reluctant to let them do so. It is here where the film gives the viewer the conundrum of the situation in war-torn areas, through two men without any rivalry, bent on their duty, yet a stark difference, exposing the conundrum of truth. Taking his duty very seriously, Newton steals Aatma Singh's rifle and holds the officer at gunpoint till the villagers cast their votes. Singh comments out of frustration that he did not want polling to be conducted in an area that was only secured by government forces 6 months ago, mentioning that there are still more landmines than men. He tells Newton that he doesn't want to lose any more troops, especially when the government cannot even supply them with night vision goggles that they have been requesting for 2 years. Newton keeps him at gunpoint even after the voting for the remaining two minutes of his official duty (till 3 pm). The CRPF troops then beat him up out of frustration.

The movie concludes with a shot of the area six months later, showing mining activity going on. Aatma Singh is shown shopping in civilian dress with his wife and daughter during holidays, suggesting he is humane and conditions in Naxal-affected areas made him a dispassionate and cynical person. Newton is shown in his office wearing a neck brace for his injury from the beating but otherwise happy, and keeping with his old ways. He is visited by the local election officer Malko (Anjali Patil) who asks him what happened after she left as she is unaware of the events and Newton asks her to tell everything over tea, but only after five minutes, when Newton's scheduled lunch break begins.

Cast 
 Rajkummar Rao as Newton Kumar
 Pankaj Tripathi as Assistant Commandant Aatma Singh
 Anjali Patil as Malko Netam
 Raghubir Yadav as Loknath
 Danish Hussain as Police DIG
 Mukesh Prajapati as Shambhu
 Krishna Singh Bisht as Krishna
 Pistak Gond as The Village Patel
 Sanjay Mishra in a special appearance as an Election Instructor
 Mukesh Nagar as Mangal Netam
 Bachan Pachera as Newton's Father
 Kirti Shreeyansh Jain as Newton's Mother
 Omkar Das Manikpuri as Lakhma

Soundtrack

Reception
Newton  was released to universal critical acclaim and was also a commercial success. On Rotten Tomatoes, Newton  has an approval rating of 94% based on 18 reviews, with an average rating of 7.6/10. On the Indian film review aggregator website The Review Monk, Newton received a 7.5 out of 10 average score based on 23 reviews.

Rajeev Masand gave the film a rating of 4 stars out of 5 and said that, "Newton is relevant and timely without being boring or inaccessible. You could say it lays on its message too thick in the end, or that the pace occasionally slips. But these are minor nigglings that never dent the impact of its thrust." Neil Soans of The Times of India gave the film a rating of 4.5 stars out of 5, saying, "Newton has dared to take on an issue that our vast majority turns a blind eye to, and slaps us out of our blissful ignorance. Amidst laughing, it'll leave you thinking, which - and we need to be reminded of this - is what good cinema should do. Both your funny bone and your grey cells will thank you for watching it." Soans praised the performances of the cast - particularly that of Rao and Tripathi - and the screenplay by Masurkar and Tewari.

Suhani Singh of India Today gave the film a rating of 4 stars out of 5 and said that, "Newton is a dark comedy that gives you equal measures of dread and disillusionment and hope and hilarity. It makes you see the pitfalls of the democratic system but also tells you that it's the only one capable of positive change. This is reality at its finest, with credible performances and backdrops that immerse viewers into the world and where even the faces of the background characters leave a heartbreaking impression." Shubhra Gupta of The Indian Express gave the film a rating of 4 stars out of 5 saying that, "Director Amit V Masurkar and co-scriptwriter Mayank Tewari have crafted a strong black comedy. It is as sharp and subversive as the classic Jaane Bhi Do Yaaro, and even though it is entirely sobering, it leaves us feeling just a little better about ourselves." She also praised the performances of the actors saying, "Rajkummar Rao is enjoying a purple patch. After Bareilly Ki Barfi, here he is again stitching up a big performance full of small things: blinking, thinking, doing. He is at his most interesting when he is being quiet: he makes us watch. Pankaj Tripathi, as the head of the security detail, cynical yet doing the best he can, is lovely too. For once the talented Patil has been used well, and as for Raghubir Yadav, he gives us, after Peepli Live, another stand-out act, a lesson in How To Immerse Yourself Effortlessly In Your Role.

Rohit Vats of Hindustan Times gave the film a rating of 4 stars out of 5 and said that, "It is one of the finest political satires we have seen in the last couple of years. It refrains from taking sides and offers a humorous take on state versus the Maoists bloody battle. It raises questions on the importance of the electoral system we are so proud of. It takes us much beyond what we see. The team of Rajkummar Rao, Pankaj Tripathi, Raghuvir Yadav and Anjali Patil has come up with a top-notch performance."

Harish Wankhede calls Newton 'A new Dalit Hero' in the Indian Express review. He suggests that the most reviews of the film neglect the protagonist’s social identity, while emphasising the film’s creative aspects. "Newton, no doubt, is a refreshing entry in the genre of commercial art house cinema. However, more significantly, the director offers a new social imaginary to depict the film’s protagonist. A new Dalit hero is offered to the audience through the subtle use of certain symbolic gestures and social codes." 

Newton received a warm response at its premiere at the Berlin Film Festival. It also won the CICAE Award for best film in the Forum Section. The Huffington Post wrote "Newton is a touching, personal and very human film about the strength of one very resolute rookie election clerk to uphold the democratic process in a rebel-threatened area."

Newton was India's official entry for the 90th Academy Awards; it was also the first Indian film to receive a grant of Rs 1 crore from the Central Government.

Release
Newton had its world premiere at the Berlin International Film Festival held from 9–19 February 2017 in Berlin, Germany while in India it got released on 22 September 2017.

Box office
Newton grossed Rs 11.75 crore net in the first week in India. The film grossed Rs 3.75 crore in its second weekend, taking the total to Rs 15.50 crore. It was a box office success.

Controversy 
After the film's release and its selection as India's entry for the Oscars, Newton was criticized for its striking similarities with the Iranian movie Secret Ballot. In defense, film-maker Anurag Kashyap voiced his support to the team of Newton, stating "Newton is as much a copy of Secret Ballot, The Avengers is of Watan Ke Rakhwale".

The producer and director of Secret Ballot further clarified that Newton is not a copy of his film. Anurag Kashyap started an online chat with the producer of Secret Ballot Marco Müller, and he stated that "There's not even a hint of plagiarism". Kashyap then asked for his permission and shared a screenshot of the conversation on his Facebook account. Subsequently, the director of the Iranian film Babak Payami stated in an online interview that he "saw the film and there is no sign of plagiarism. These are completely different films."

Other commentators have noted a similarity between the film's official poster and that for Satyajit Ray's film Ganashatru.

Awards and nominations

See also
 List of submissions to the 90th Academy Awards for Best Foreign Language Film
 List of Indian submissions for the Academy Award for Best Foreign Language Film

References

External links 
 

2017 films
2010s Hindi-language films
Films scored by Rachita Arora
Films scored by Benedict Taylor
2017 black comedy films
Indian black comedy films
2010s political comedy-drama films
Indian political comedy-drama films
Films about elections
Best Hindi Feature Film National Film Award winners